Fernando Jara (born December 18, 1987, in Panama) is a thoroughbred horse racing jockey in the United States. Aboard Jazil he won the 2006 Belmont Stakes. In addition, he was the primary North American rider of 2006 American Horse of the Year Invasor, and rode him to victory in the 2006 Breeders' Cup Classic, 2007 Donn Handicap and 2007 Dubai World Cup.

References

 Fernando Jara at the NTRA

Year-end charts

1987 births
Living people
American jockeys
Panamanian jockeys
Panamanian emigrants to the United States
People from Herrera Province